Yaroslav Borysovych Lopatynskyi (1906–1981) was a Soviet mathematician. Born in Tbilisi, Lopatinskii acquired wide acclaim for his contributions to the theory of differential equations. He is especially known for his condition of stability for boundary-value problems in elliptic equations and for initial boundary-value problems in evolution PDEs.

See also 

 Lev Lopatinsky

References
http://www-history.mcs.st-and.ac.uk/Biographies/Lopatynsky.html

1906 births
1981 deaths
Mathematical analysts
Soviet mathematicians